Félix, Count Goblet d'Alviella (26 May 1884 – 7 February 1957) was a Belgian lawyer, director of the Revue de Belgique, alderman and Olympic fencer. He was married to Eva Boël (1883–1956), and was the father of Jean Goblet d'Alviella. He was a son of Eugene Goblet d'Alviella.

He won a silver medal in the team épée competition at the 1920 Summer Olympics.

References

Notes
D'Hoore, M., Archives de particuliers relatives à l’histoire de la Belgique contemporaine (de 1830 à nos jours), Bruxelles, AGR, 1998, 2 vol., p. 381.
Le Livre Bleu. Recueil biographique, Brussel, Maison Ferd. Larcier, 1950, p. 245.

1884 births
1957 deaths
Felix
Belgian male fencers
Belgian épée fencers
Olympic fencers of Belgium
Fencers at the 1920 Summer Olympics
Fencers at the 1924 Summer Olympics
Olympic silver medalists for Belgium
Olympic medalists in fencing
Medalists at the 1920 Summer Olympics
Sportspeople from Brussels